Jung Kil Kim (born February 23, 1936), also known as Tiger Kim, is a martial arts practitioner.  A native of the nation of South Korea he won numerous titles including the Asian Martial Arts Championship Tournament.

Early life
Kim attended Dongju College and became an instructor at the Tang Soo Do Moo Duk Kwan Headquarters in Korea. He became a captain in the Korean National Police.

Later life
Kim served as the President of the AAU Tae Kwon Do Association.  State President of Colorado Taekwondo Association.  He received a Presidential Champions Award from President George W. Bush. He served as president of the Korean Taekwondo Association as late as 2006.

Media
Tiger Kim was on the cover of Official Karate Magazine in October 1980 and Tae Kwon Do Times in November 1985.

Books
He wrote a number of books including WTF Taekwondo Tang Soo Do Forms and The Ultimate Beginners Guide to Martial Arts: The Difference Between The Arts Explained by Industry Professionals.

References

External links
 

South Korean male taekwondo practitioners
Martial arts writers
Living people
South Korean sportswriters
1936 births